Gana Suraksha Party (Trans: People's Protection Party) was founded by Lok Sabha MP, Heera Saraniya and it is a significant party in Bodoland Territorial Council.

Electoral performance

References

Political parties in Assam
Bodoland
2019 establishments in Assam